Ottwell Binns (1872 - 1935) was a British novelist and Unitarian minister.  Binns was a prolific author, publishing many novels of adventure and mystery, from 1917 to 1939. His publisher in Britain was Ward Lock. Though he died in 1935, Ward Lock continued to publish novels under his name until 1939.  His novel A Mating in the Wild was published in the U.S. in 1920 by Alfred A. Knopf and the A. L. Burt Company.

Binns also published novels with Ward Lock under the pseudonym of Ben Bolt; these were similar in subject matter and treatment to the novels published under his own name.  His stories were set in many locations, including Britain and the European continent, Africa, Asia, the South Pacific, the Caribbean and Canada, particularly the Yukon.  His novels always feature a courageous, resourceful hero and a love interest, and there is an emphasis on action and narrow escapes from danger.

His son, Max Dalman Binns, was also a mystery writer under the name Max Dalman.

Work 

A partial list of his published books includes:

 1917  The Man from Maloba
 1918  A Sin of Silence
 1919  The Lady of the Miniature
 1920  The Mystery of the Heart
 1920  A Mating in the Wilds
 1922  The Treasure of Christophe
 1922  The Lady of North Star
 1923  The Lifting of the Shadow
 1924  Clancy of the Mounted Police
 1925  The Trail of Adventure
 1925  Java Jack
 1926  A Gipsy of the North
 1926  Flotsam of the Line
 1928  Behind the Ranges
 1930  Dan Yeo
 1930  The Vanished Guest
 1930  The White Hands of Justice
 1931  The Secret Pearls
 1931  The Grey Rat
 1931  The Flaming Crescent
 1932  Trader Random
 1933  Secret Adventure
 1934  Gold is King
 1934  The Red Token
 1935  The Last Door
 1936  The Far Pursuit
 1936  Weeds of Hate
 1937  A Soldier of the Legion
 1937  The Poisoned Pen
 1938  By Papuan Waters
 1938  A Shot in the Woods

A partial list of novels written as Ben Bolt:
 1921  Diana of the Islands
 1921  The Diamond Buckled Shoe
 1928  The Jewels of Sin
 1930  The Badge
 1930  The Other Three
 1930  The Coil of Mystery
 1931  The Forest Ranger
 1931  The Sealed Envelope
 1932  The Subway Mystery
 1933  The Green Arrow
 1935  The Crooked Sign
 1936  The Five Red Stars
 1936  The Empty House Mystery
 1937  By Breathless Ways
 1939  The Girl in the Train

References

External links
 
 
 

1872 births
1935 deaths
20th-century British novelists
Crime novelists